The 2013 Judo Grand Prix Almaty was held in Almaty, Kazakhstan from 28 to 29 September 2013.

Medal summary

Men's events

Women's events

Source Results

Medal table

References

External links
 

2013 IJF World Tour
2013 Judo Grand Prix
Judo
Grand 2013
Judo
Judo